The 29th Daytime Emmy Awards ceremony, commemorating excellence in American daytime programming from 2001, was held on May 17, 2002 at the theater at Madison Square Garden in New York City. Hosted by Bob Barker, it was televised in the United States by CBS.  It was also the first time the ceremonies were simulcast in Spanish.

Creative Arts Emmy Awards were presented on April 29, 2002.

Mistakes
When Susan Flannery's name was announced as the winner of the Outstanding Lead Actress in a Drama Series Award, the "Flannery" part was unintelligible. Everybody in the television production booth thought it was Susan Lucci who was named, and therefore cut to a shot of Lucci (who was backstage at the time after presenting the previous award), cued the All My Children theme song, and told her to go on stage. Once the producers realized their mistake, they immediately cut to Flannery coming towards the stage, and Lucci returned backstage. The producers apologized for their mistake the following day.

Nominations and winners
The following is a partial list of nominees, with winners in bold:

Outstanding Drama Series
All My Children
As the World Turns
One Life to Live
The Young and the Restless

Outstanding Actor in a Drama Series
Peter Bergman (Jack Abbott, The Young and the Restless)
Hunt Block (Craig Montgomery, As the World Turns)
Vincent Irizarry (David Hayward, All My Children)
Robert Newman (Joshua Lewis, Guiding Light)
Jack Scalia (Chris Stamp, All My Children)

Outstanding Actress in a Drama Series
Martha Byrne (Lily Walsh Snyder, As the World Turns)
Susan Flannery (Stephanie Forrester, The Bold and the Beautiful)
Finola Hughes (Anna Devane, All My Children)
Susan Lucci (Erica Kane, All My Children)
Colleen Zenk Pinter (Barbara Ryan, As the World Turns)

Outstanding Supporting Actor in a Drama Series
Mark Consuelos (Mateo Santos, All My Children)
Josh Duhamel (Leo du Pres, All My Children)
Benjamin Hendrickson (Hal Munson, As the World Turns)
Paul Leyden (Simon Frasier, As the World Turns)
Cameron Mathison (Ryan Lavery, All My Children)

Outstanding Supporting Actress in a Drama Series
Crystal Chappell (Olivia Spencer, Guiding Light)
Beth Ehlers (Harley Cooper, Guiding Light)
Kelley Menighan Hensley (Emily Stewart, As the World Turns)
Kelly Ripa (Hayley Vaughan, All My Children)
Maura West (Carly Snyder, As the World Turns)

Outstanding Younger Actor in a Drama Series
Jesse McCartney (JR Chandler, All My Children)
Brian Presley (Jack Ramsey, Port Charles)
Justin Torkildsen (Rick Forrester, The Bold and the Beautiful)
Jordi Vilasuso (Tony Santos, Guiding Light)
Jacob Young (Lucky Spencer, General Hospital)

Outstanding Younger Actress in a Drama Series
Jennifer Finnigan (Bridget Forrester, The Bold and the Beautiful)
Jessica Jimenez (Catalina Quesada, Guiding Light)
Lindsey McKeon (Marah Lewis, Guiding Light)
Eden Riegel (Bianca Montgomery, All My Children)
Kristina Sisco (Abigail Williams, As the World Turns)

Outstanding Drama Series Writing Team
All My Children
As the World Turns
One Life to Live
Passions

Outstanding Drama Series Directing Team
All My Children
As the World Turns
The Bold and the Beautiful
The Young and the Restless

Outstanding Game/Audience Participation Show
Hollywood Squares
Jeopardy!
The Price is Right
Win Ben Stein's Money

Outstanding Game Show Host
Bob Barker, The Price is Right
Pat Sajak, Wheel of Fortune
Ben Stein and Nancy Pimental, Win Ben Stein's Money
Alex Trebek, Jeopardy!

Outstanding Talk Show
Live With Regis and Kelly
The Montel Williams Show
The Rosie O'Donnell Show
The View

Outstanding Talk Show Host
Rosie O'Donnell, The Rosie O'Donnell Show
Regis Philbin and Kelly Ripa, Live With Regis and Kelly
Barbara Walters, Meredith Vieira, Star Jones, Joy Behar and Lisa Ling, The View
Montel Williams, The Montel Williams Show

Outstanding Service Show
The Christopher Lowell Show
Essence of Emeril
Martha Stewart Living
This Old House
Wolfgang Puck

Outstanding Service Show Host
Emeril Lagasse, Essence of Emeril
Christopher Lowell, The Christopher Lowell Show
Martha Stewart, Martha Stewart Living
Steve Thomas, This Old House

Outstanding Special Class Series
Behind the Screen with John Burke
Cool Women in History with Susan Sarandon
Judge Judy
Pop-up Video
Trading Spaces

Outstanding Children's Animated Program
Arthur
Clifford the Big Red Dog
Dora the Explorer
Dragon Tales
Madeline

Outstanding Special Class Animated Program
Batman Beyond
The Legend of Tarzan
Little Bill
Rolie Polie Olie
Gary Baseman, Bill Steinkellner, Cherie Steinkellner, Jess Winfield, Nancylee Myatt, Timothy Björklund, Alfred Gimeno, Jamie Thomason and David Maples (Teacher's Pet)

Outstanding Sound Editing
Greg Stewart, Ian Emberton, Wendy Romano, Tony Gort and Patrick S. Clark (Off Season)
Michael C. Gutierre, James L. Pearson, Anthony Torretto, Susan Welsh and Debby Ruby-Winsberg (The Nightmare Room)
Michael Lyle, James Bladon, Paul Menichini, Marc Allen and Lance Wiseman (V.I.P.)

Outstanding Sound Editing - Special Class
Roshaun Hawley, Paca Thomas, Dan Cubert and Marc S. Perlman (Men in Black: The Series)
Robert Schott, Brian Beatrice and Christopher Fina (Between the Lions)
Robert Duran and Roshaun Hawley (Jackie Chan Adventures)

Outstanding Sound Mixing
Stephen Traub and Ric Jurgens (The Zack Files)
Robert Montrone, Joe Carpenter, Josiah Gluck and David Pliskin (Martha Stewart Living)
Matt Foglia (MTV: Grammys Uncensored)
Chuck Buch and Edward F. Suski (Power Rangers Time Force)
Christopher Allan and Dan Lesiw (Zoom)

Outstanding Sound Mixing - Special Class
Dick Maitland, Blake Norton and Bob Schott (Sesame Street)
Stéphane Bergeron (Arthur)
Gregory Cathcart, Devon Bowman and Dan Cubert (Clifford the Big Red Dog)
Melissa Ellis, Fil Brown and Dan Cubert (Jackie Chan Adventures)

Outstanding Single Camera Editing
Roderick Davis, Tad Nyland and John Gilbert (V.I.P.)
Douglas Schuetz, Juantxo Royo and Laura Young (Reading Rainbow)
Terry Cafaro, Vincent J. Straggas and Laura Cheshire (Between the Lions)
Gary Stephenson (This Old House)
Brian Ford and Todd Maurer (Trading Spaces)
Arnie Harchik and Julie Kahn Zunder (Zoom)

Outstanding Performer In An Animated Program
Jackie Chan, (Himself, Jackie Chan Adventures)
Kel Mitchell (T-Bone, Clifford the Big Red Dog)
John Ritter (Clifford, Clifford the Big Red Dog)
Charles Shaughnessy (Dennis, Stanley)
Alicia Silverstone (Sharon Spitz, Braceface)

Outstanding Pre-School Children's Series
Blue's Clues
Sesame Street

Outstanding Children's Series
Between the Lions
Discovery Kids Ultimate Guide to the Awesome
Even Stevens
Reading Rainbow
ZOOM

Outstanding Directing in a Children's Series
Mitchell Kriegman and Dean Gordon (The Book of Pooh)
Emily Squires, Ted May, Steve Feldman, Victor DiNapoli, Jim Martin, Lisa Simon and Ken Diego (Sesame Street)
Lucy Walker, Dave Palmer and Koyalee Chanda (Blue's Clues)
Ed Wiseman (Reading Rainbow)
Bob Comiskey (ZOOM)

Outstanding Directing in a Children's Special
Adam Arkin (My Louisiana Sky)
Eric Stoltz (My Horrible Year!)
Bruce Davison (Off Season)
Richard Friedenberg (Snow in August)

Outstanding Performer in a Children's Series
LeVar Burton (Himself, Reading Rainbow)
Kevin Clash (Elmo, Sesame Street)
Mary-Kate Olsen (Riley, So Little Time)
Donna Pescow (Eileen Stevens, Even Stevens)
Fred Rogers (Mister Rogers, Mister Rogers' Neighborhood)

Outstanding Performer in a Children's Special
Kelsey Keel (Tiger Ann Parker, My Louisiana Sky)
Kevin Clash (Elmo, Elmo's World: The Wild Wild West)
Juliette Lewis (Dorie Kay, My Louisiana Sky)
Hume Cronyn (Sam Clausner, Off Season)
Stephen Rea (Rabbi Judah Hirsch, Snow in August)

Outstanding Writing in a Children's Special
Glenn Gers (Off Season)
Molly Boylan and Judy Freudberg (Elmo's World: The Wild Wild West)
Anna Sandor (My Louisiana Sky)
Karen Leigh Hopkins (What Girls Learn)

Outstanding Individual Achievement in Animation
Valery Mihalkov (Sagwa, the Chinese Siamese Cat)

Lifetime Achievement Award
John Cannon, longtime announcer and voice-over actor.

Special Tribute
Guiding Light

References

External links
 
 
 

029
Daytime Emmy Awards

it:Premi Emmy 2002#Premi Emmy per il Daytime